Judy Forras (22 November 1932 – 1996) was an Australian alpine skier. She competed in three events at the 1964 Winter Olympics.

References

1932 births
1996 deaths
Australian female alpine skiers
Olympic alpine skiers of Australia
Alpine skiers at the 1964 Winter Olympics
Skiers from Melbourne
20th-century Australian women